The 2018 Boston College Eagles football team represented Boston College during the 2018 NCAA Division I FBS football season. The Eagles played their home games at Alumni Stadium in Chestnut Hill, Massachusetts, and competed in the Atlantic Division of the Atlantic Coast Conference. They were led by sixth-year head coach Steve Addazio. They finished the season 7–5 overall and 4–4 in ACC play to place the fourth n the Atlantic Division. They were invited to the First Responder Bowl against Boise State. With 5:08 left in the first quarter and Boston College leading 7–0, the bowl game was stopped because of bad weather and ultimately canceled and ruled a no contest.

Previous season
The Eagles finished the 2017 season 7–6, 4–4 in ACC play to finish in a three-way tie for third place in the Atlantic Division. They were invited to the Pinstripe Bowl where they lost to Iowa.

Recruiting

Position key

Recruits

The Eagles signed a total of 20 recruits.

Preseason

Award watch lists
Listed in the order that they were released

ACC media poll
The ACC media poll was released on July 24, 2018.

Schedule

Game summaries

UMass

In the Battle of the Bay State, BC used their RB A. J. Dillon early and often and cruised to an opening day victory

Holy Cross

QB Anthony Brown continued his stellar start to the season and led BC to an easy win over FCS Holy Cross

at Wake Forest

In a redemption game from last season, Anthony Brown threw for a career high 5 touchdowns in BC’s ACC opening win over Wake Forest. BC would get into the AP Poll at #23 the next day

at Purdue

In their first game as a ranked team since 2009, the Eagles excitement got the better of them as they lost for the first time this season to winless Purdue. It knocked BC out of the rankings

Temple

A. J. Dillon led his team to a bounce back win over Temple with two touchdowns as the Eagles stayed undefeated at Alumni Stadium in 2018

at NC State

Despite causing turnovers in Raleigh, the Eagles offense could not answer without Dillon and lost their first ACC game of 2018 to the Wolfpack

Louisville

In a must win ACC game, BC would jump out to an early 14-0 lead. Sloppy play and miscues allowed Louisville to take a 20-14 lead in the half. But BC used a blocked punt TD to retake the lead and would score the final 24 points of the game to defeat the Cardinals and get to the off week with a 5-2 record

Miami (FL)

In the 5th edition of the Red Bandanna Game, A. J. Dillon returned to give the Eagles and their wild crowd their best victory over the season over the #25 Hurricanes. Anthony Brown also had two TDs (1 Pass 1 Rush) and BC’s defense caused two interceptions in the second half that led to 10 points

at Virginia Tech

The Eagles visited Virginia Tech and pulled out a 31–21 victory. Sophomore Travis Levy gave BC a boost with two rushing TDs in the second half after falling behind 14–7. A. J. Dillon left the game with an injury

Clemson

In what was deemed the biggest game of the year for the Boston College Eagles, the defense played a role in holding Clemson to a 13-7 lead at halftime. But without Anthony Brown, who was injured on BC’s first possession of the game, the Eagles could not muster enough offense and dropped a tough matchup to the second ranked Tigers

at Florida State

The Eagles were big favorites even after a tough loss last week. But with both Brown and Dillon not one hundred percent, the Eagles offense struggled and the Seminoles picked up a late TD pass in the final two minutes of regulation to get an upset

Syracuse

Eric Dungey was in full form even after getting injured against Notre Dame the week before and the Eagles could not stop him or the Orange offense in another lackluster game for the Eagles. Brown accounted for all of BC’s touchdowns but Dillon was still banged up and BC finished the regular season 7–5 for the third straight year

vs. Boise State (First Responder Bowl)

With Boston College leading 7–0 with 5:08 remaining in the 1st quarter, the game was delayed due to inclement weather. After an hour and a half delay, the game was canceled and ruled a no contest

A. J. Dillon scored on the Eagles' first possession; a 19-yard touchdown run. He had 33 yards on six carries. Anthony Brown was 4-for-6 passing for 54 yards, while Kobay White made two catches for 35 yards.

Rankings

Roster

2019 NFL Draft

References

Boston College
Boston College Eagles football seasons
Boston College Eagles football
Boston College Eagles football